Laurite is an opaque black, metallic ruthenium sulfide mineral with formula: RuS2. It crystallizes in the isometric system. It is in the pyrite structural group. Though it's been found in many localities worldwide, it is extremely rare.

Laurite has a Mohs hardness of 7.5 and a specific gravity of 6.43. It can contain osmium, rhodium, iridium, and iron substituting for the ruthenium. The sulfur is present as the disulfide ion, so the ruthenium is in the Ru(II) oxidation state.

Discovery and occurrence
It was discovered in 1866 in Borneo, Malaysia and named for Laurie, the wife of Charles A. Joy, an American chemist. It occurs in ultramafic magmatic cumulate deposits and sedimentary placer deposits derived from them. It occurs associated with cooperite, braggite, sperrylite, other minerals of the platinum group elements and chromite.

Synthetic RuS2 is a highly active catalyst for hydrodesulfurization.

References

Disulfides
Ruthenium minerals
Pyrite group
Transition metal dichalcogenides
Cubic minerals
Minerals in space group 205
Ruthenium(II) compounds
Minerals described in 1866